Krishna Gopalakrishna is a 2002 Indian Malayalam-language film, directed by Balachandra Menon and produced by Krishnan Nair. The film stars Manoj K. Jayan, Ashokan, Balachandra Menon and Kalpana in lead roles. The film had musical score by Balachandra Menon.

Plot
The story is about the life and time of Gopalakrishnan who was born into an ordinary family. His father was a moneylender while his mother was an ardent devotee of Lord Krishna. Gopalakrisknan grows up hearing the stories of Krishna and his ambition was to start a dairy farm. His childhood sweetheart was Radha, but after many reels he marries the wrong girl. After his mother's death he becomes an alcoholic and is neglected by his wife and children. Seeking peace he ends up in an ashram, but soon falls sick and needs an operation. At the hospital he meets his old flame Radha and hopes to recover and live with her in a farm full of cows.

Cast
Manoj K. Jayan 
Balachandra Menon as Gopalakrishnan
Kalpana  as Sujatha
Santhosh as Jangathnathan
Siddique as Moidu Master
Sreeja Chandran as Radha
Geethu Mohandas as Gayathri
Ashokan as Peter 
Indraja as Bhama
Sreenivasan 
Lal 
Geetha Nair
Master Vignesh
Mini Nair
Poojappura Radhakrishnan
Valsala Menon

Soundtrack
The music was composed by Balachandra Menon.

References

External links
 

2002 films
2000s Malayalam-language films
Films directed by Balachandra Menon